Adrian Nogowski (born 27 March 1990) is a  former Polish handball player.

References 

1990 births
Living people
People from Kwidzyn
Polish male handball players